Daniel Rickenmann (born 1969/1970) is an American businessman and politician, serving as the Mayor of Columbia, South Carolina. Born in Spartanburg, South Carolina, he is the son of immigrants from Switzerland. He attended the University of South Carolina in 1987.

Political career 

In 2004, he was elected as an at-large representative for the city council of Columbia, South Carolina. He held the position until 2013 when he chose not to run for reelection. He ran again for city council in 2017, winning the election as a representative from Columbia's fourth district. 

On November 16, 2021, Rickenmann won a runoff election against Tameika Devine, a councilwoman for the city of Columbia. Rickenman won 52% of the vote to Devine's 48%. He was sworn in as mayor of Columbia on January 4, 2022, succeeding Stephen K. Benjamin, who did not seek reelection.

While candidates for the office of mayor in Columbia, SC are officially non-partisan, Rickenmann is a Republican. Conversely, his opponent in the 2021 election, Tameika Devine, is a Democrat. Devine was endorsed by former U.S. president Barack Obama and House Whip Jim Clyburn. Previously, Columbia has historically voted for Democratic candidates, including Joe Biden for U.S. president by nearly 40 points. Its two previous mayors, Bob Coble and Steve Benjamin were Democrats. Some Republicans, including Ben Shapiro and United States Senator Rick Scott of Florida, cited Rickenmann's win as part of a "red wave."

Electoral history

Notes

External links 
 Mayor's Inauguration and Swearing In Ceremony, January 4, 2022

References

Living people
South Carolina politicians
South Carolina Republicans
Mayors of Columbia, South Carolina
Year of birth missing (living people)